Amaurobius pallidus is a species of spider in the family Amaurobiidae, found in Southeastern Europe to Georgia.

References

pallidus
Spiders of Europe
Spiders of Georgia (country)
Spiders described in 1868